The Mankhan Uul mine is a large mine in Mongolia. Ongilog Lake represents one of the largest phosphates reserve in Mongolia having estimated reserves of 1.6 billion tonnes of ore grading 35% P2O5.

References 

Phosphate mines in Mongolia